Sneh Wongchaoom (born 1934) is a Thai sprinter. He competed in the men's 100 metres at the 1956 Summer Olympics.

References

External links
 

1934 births
Living people
Athletes (track and field) at the 1956 Summer Olympics
Sneh Wongchaoom
Sneh Wongchaoom
Place of birth missing (living people)